Artillery is an early 20th century painting by French artist Roger de La Fresnaye. Done in oil on canvas, the painting depicts French soldiers, artillerymen, a French officer, and a field gun (an artillery piece) under tow. The work is currently in the collection of the Metropolitan Museum of Art.

References 

1911 paintings
Paintings in the collection of the Metropolitan Museum of Art
Cubist paintings
French paintings